Edison School District 54JT is a school district headquartered in Yoder, an unincorporated area in El Paso County, Colorado.

The district serves a portion of Pueblo County.

Its schools include;
 Edison Elementary School
 Edison Middle School and High School (a.k.a. Edison Secondary)
 Alternative high school programs: Edison Academy and Edison Prep

References

External links
 

School districts in Colorado
Education in El Paso County, Colorado
Education in Pueblo County, Colorado